William R. Harwood is a scientist and author, contributor to Skeptical Inquirer, Free Inquiry, and contributing editor to the American Rationalist. He is the author of over 50 books including Mythology’s Last Gods (Prometheus, 1992), God, Jesus and the Bible: The Origin and Evolution of Religion, Dictionary of Contemporary Mythology; The Disinformation Cycle; several novels, and the two-volume The Fully Translated Bible (ed/tr), as well as over 600 articles and book reviews for periodicals in nine countries.

He obtained his B.Ed. and M.A from the University of Calgary in 1972 and 1974, M.Litt. from the University of Cambridge in 1979, and Ph.D. from Columbia Pacific University in 1983.

Books
 Dictionary of Contemporary Mythology
 Mythology’s Last Gods: Yahweh and Jesus (Prometheus, 1992)
 Complete Proof That the Earth is FlatOr That the Bible is Fiction: There is No Third Alternative

References

Year of birth missing (living people)
Living people
Irreligion in the United States
21st-century American novelists
American atheists
American humanists
American male novelists
American science fiction writers
American skeptics
Critics of Christianity
Secular humanists
21st-century American male writers